Our Lady of Caravaggio is a reported apparition of the Virgin Mary at  Caravaggio, Italy in 1432.

History
The apparition was reported by Giovannette, daughter of Pietr Vaccli and wife of Francesco Varoli. She said that on 26 May 1432, Mary appeared in a field in Caravaggio, in Northern Italy, in the region of Milan; and said that her son was angry, that for him people should fast on Fridays and for her they should celebrate Saturdays after vespers. Our Lady announced peace to Giovannette in her family, among the neighboring warring states and reconciliation between the Church in the East and West, through the Council of Florence (1436—1445). As memento of her presence she left the imprint of her feet on the stone where she stood. A spring of water sprung forth from under the stone. 
 
Eventually a modest shrine was built at the place of the apparition thanks to the Duke of Milan, Filberto Maria Viscouti. In 1575, Charles Borromeo hired the architect, Pellegrinio Pellegrinis to enlarge the sanctuary. The Madonna di Caravaggio, or "del Fonte", is now an enormous shrine. In the sixteenth, seventeenth, and eighteenth centuries, it inspired a number of satellite shrines and some imitative visions.<ref>[http://libro.uca.edu/christian/apparitions1.htm Christian Jr., William A., "Introduction: Rural Life and Religion", Apparitions in Late Medieval and Renaissance Spain", Chap 1]</ref> The sanctuary still exists and attracts many people. Ultimately, Pope Clement XI crowned the venerated image on 30 September 1710.

Notes

References
 Cobham, Ebenezer. A Dictionary of Miracles'' Chatto & Windus, 1901
 "The Age of Marian Apparitions". Daily Catholic, Vol.9, No.129, July 1998

External links
 International Marian Research Institute at the University of Dayton. The Institute, a leading center for research and scholarship on the Blessed Virgin Mary, has a vast presence in cyberspace.
 Marian Library at the University of Dayton. The Marian Library is the world's largest repository of books, periodicals, artwork, and artifacts on Mary, the mother of Jesus Christ.
Santuario di Caravaggio - official website

Caravaggio
C